Pandemis dryoxesta is a species of moth of the family Tortricidae. It is found in what was the Punjab region of British India.

References

	

Moths described in 1920
Pandemis